John O'Gaunt may refer to:

 John of Gaunt (1340–1399), English nobleman
 John O'Gaunt (automobile), a pre-1905 English automobile
 John O'Gaunt School, a mixed comprehensive school in Hungerford, Berkshire, England
 John O'Gaunt, Leicestershire, a locality in England
 John O' Gaunt railway station
 Lancaster John O' Gaunt Rowing Club, a rowing club in Lancaster, Lancashire, England
 John O'Gaunt (1809 ship), an 1809 merchant ship